Alfredo Rota (born 21 July 1975) is an Italian fencer. He won the bronze medal in the men's team épée event at the 2008 Summer Olympics. He also won the Olympic gold medal in Men's Team Épée at the 2000 Sydney Olympics.

References

External links 
 
 
 
 
 

1975 births
Living people
Fencers from Milan
Italian male fencers
Fencers at the 2000 Summer Olympics
Fencers at the 2004 Summer Olympics
Fencers at the 2008 Summer Olympics
Olympic fencers of Italy
Olympic gold medalists for Italy
Olympic bronze medalists for Italy
Olympic medalists in fencing
Medalists at the 2000 Summer Olympics
Medalists at the 2008 Summer Olympics
Fencers of Centro Sportivo Carabinieri